S.S. Lazio Calcio a 5 is an Italian women 5-a-side football team of a 5-a-side football club of the same name. The club is part of  multi-sport club. The multi-sport club is related to S.S. Lazio, the professional football club, but did not related in terms of ownership.

Structure
The women 5-a-side section had the first team, as well as youth teams known as Juniores, Allieve and Giovanissime.

Honours
 Serie A
 Winners: (?) 2000, 2001, 2003

Namesakes
In 2018, A.S.D. Nova Phoenix was renamed to A.S.D. S.S. Lazio C5 Femminile.

There was yet another namesake women's 5-a-side-football club, Sabina Lazio Calcetto, Sabina Lazio Calcetto played in 2018–19 Serie C.

Both team were not officially affiliated to the multi-sport club.

See also 
 S.S. Lazio Women 2015

References

External links
  

Futsal clubs in Italy
Women's futsal clubs
S.S. Lazio
Football clubs in Rome